Scott Jonathan Shapiro is the Charles F. Southmayd Professor of Law and Philosophy at Yale Law School and the Director of Yale's Center for Law and Philosophy and of the Yale CyberSecurity Lab.

He received his B.A. in Philosophy from Columbia College, his J.D. from Yale Law School, and his Ph.D. in Philosophy from Columbia University. He also studied at Yeshivat Har Etzion in Israel. After law school, Shapiro served as a clerk for Judge Pierre Leval on the U.S. District Court for the Southern District of New York. At Yale, he teaches in Jurisprudence, Constitutional Law, Cyberlaw, and Cybersecurity.

He is the author of work in jurisprudence and legal theory, including "Legality". He is also the editor of the "Oxford Handbook of Jurisprudence and Philosophy of Law". He has been cited for his work on the planning theory of law and for pioneering experimental jurisprudence. He serves as an editor of Legal Theory and the Stanford Encyclopedia of Philosophy.

With Oona A. Hathaway, he developed the concept of "outcasting" in international law and has been critical of humanitarian intervention without authorization from the UN Security Council. His book with Hathaway, The Internationalists: How a Radical Plan to Outlaw War Remade the World, was published by Simon & Schuster in September 2017, and received wide acclaim by The New Yorker, The Financial Times, and The Economist, among others.

Bibliography

Books
 Jules L. Coleman, Kenneth Einar Himma, and Scott J. Shapiro (eds), The Oxford Handbook of Jurisprudence and Philosophy of Law, 2002, Oxford University Press
 Scott J. Shapiro, Legality, 2011, Harvard University Press
 
 Published in the UK as

Articles and working papers 
 Scott J. Shapiro, “The ‘Hart-Dworkin’ Debate: A Short Guide for the Perplexed,” Public Law and Legal Theory Research Paper Series: Working Paper No. 77, 2007, University of Michigan Law School
 Oona Hathaway and Scott J. Shapiro, “Outcasting: Enforcement in Domestic and International Law,” Yale Law Journal, Vol. 121, No. 2, 252, 2011, Yale Law School, Public Law Working Paper No. 240

Critical studies and reviews of Shapiro's work
The internationalists
 

European authors

References 

21st-century American philosophers
Philosophers of law
Yale Law School faculty
Living people
Year of birth missing (living people)
Yeshivat Har Etzion
Columbia College (New York) alumni
Yale Law School alumni
Columbia Graduate School of Arts and Sciences alumni